Emir Plakalo (born 19 February 1995) is a Bosnian professional footballer who plays as a goalkeeper for Swedish club Lunds BK.

Club career
Plakalo started his career with FK Sarajevo, where he made eight league appearances. In January 2019 he signed for Greek outfit Aiginiakos after a first spell in Sweden.

References

External links
 
 

1995 births
Living people
Association football goalkeepers
Bosnia and Herzegovina footballers
FK Sarajevo players
NK Metalleghe-BSI players
FC Rosengård 1917 players
Aiginiakos F.C. players
Åtvidabergs FF players
FC Linköping City players
Lunds BK players
Premier League of Bosnia and Herzegovina players
Football League (Greece) players
Ettan Fotboll players
Bosnia and Herzegovina expatriate footballers
Expatriate footballers in Sweden
Bosnia and Herzegovina expatriate sportspeople in Sweden
Expatriate footballers in Greece
Bosnia and Herzegovina expatriate sportspeople in Greece